Taxi to Paradise is a 1933 British comedy film directed by Adrian Brunel and starring Binnie Barnes, Garry Marsh and Henry Wilcoxon. It was made as a quota quickie at Wembley Studios.

Cast
 Binnie Barnes as Joan Melhuish  
 Garry Marsh as George Melhuish  
 Henry Wilcoxon as Stephen Randall 
 Jane Carr as Claire  
 Sebastian Shaw as Tom Fanshawe  
 Picot Schooling as Manson  
 Vincent Holman as Dunning

References

Bibliography
 Low, Rachael. Filmmaking in 1930s Britain. George Allen & Unwin, 1985.
 Wood, Linda. British Films, 1927-1939. British Film Institute, 1986.

External links

1933 films
British comedy films
1933 comedy films
Films directed by Adrian Brunel
Films shot at Wembley Studios
20th Century Fox films
Quota quickies
British black-and-white films
1930s English-language films
1930s British films